Djibouti competed at the 2014 Summer Youth Olympics, in Nanjing, China from 16 August to 28 August 2014.

Medalists

Athletics

Djibouti qualified three athletes.

Qualification Legend: Q=Final A (medal); qB=Final B (non-medal); qC=Final C (non-medal); qD=Final D (non-medal); qE=Final E (non-medal)

Boys
Track & road events

Girls
Track & road events

Swimming

Djibouti qualified one swimmer.

Boys

Table Tennis

Djibouti was given a quota to compete by the tripartite committee.

Singles

Team

Qualification Legend: Q=Main Bracket (medal); qB=Consolation Bracket (non-medal)

References

You
Nations at the 2014 Summer Youth Olympics
Djibouti at the Youth Olympics